Uganda (UGA) has competed in every African Games since the first in 1965. The country has taken part in every one of the games since. Athletes from Uganda have won a total of eighty-seven medals, including twenty-two gold and twenty-one silver.

Participation
Uganda first entered the African Games (then called the All-African Games) in 1965. The team achieved a single silver medla. The country returned the following tournament, and came away with six gold, three silver and three bronze medals. Uganda has since taken part in and won medals at each of the subsequent games. Involvement has not been smooth, however. In 2003, boxers Jolly Kotongole and Sadat Tebazalwa were almost barred from entering the tournament due to non-payment of affiliation fees. Only the actions of Ugandan boxing official Sande Musoke enabled the competition to happen when he surrendered his allowances to cover the costs.

Medal tables

Medals by Games

Below is a table representing all the medals won by Uganda at the Games.

See also 
 Uganda at the Olympics
 Uganda at the Paralympics
 Sport in Uganda

References